Professor Sanjay Srivastava is a sociologist. He is currently at the Department of Anthropology and Sociology, SOAS University of London. He is visiting fellow at many institutions, including the Institute of Economic Growth, Delhi, India.

Education
Professor Srivastava completed Ph.D. in Social Anthropology from the University of Sydney in 1994.

Bibliography
Some of his written works are:

 (co-editor) (2019)  Critical Themes in Indian Sociology. Sage.
 (2015). Entangled Urbanism: Slum, Gated Community and Shopping Mall in Delhi and Gurgaon. Oxford University Press.
 (2013). Sexuality Studies. Oxford University Press.
 (2007) Passionate Modernity. Sexuality, Class and Consumption in India. Routledge.
 (contributing editor) (2004) Sexual Sites, Seminal Attitudes: Sexualities, Masculinities and Culture in South Asia. Sage.
 (Co-author) (2001) Asia. Cultural Politics in the Global Age. Palgrave.
 (1998) Constructing Post-Colonial India National Character and the Doon School. Routledge.

References 

Living people
Indian sociologists
Year of birth missing (living people)